Elb Adress is a village and one of Boutilimit's communes in the Trarza Region of south-western Mauritania.

According to the 2006 Electoral Census, Elb Adress has 6500 residents nearly half of them lives in Elb Adress, the capital of the municipality, while the rest is distributed in the following small rural villages: El-Muhammediyya, Yara, Bou Sdeira, El-Igda, Invani, Bou Tleihiyya, and El-Mara'a.

Elb Adress is the second largest commune of Boutilimit's by order of area.

References

Communes of Trarza Region